The White Raven is the third novel of the five-part Oathsworn series by Scottish writer of historical fiction, Robert Low, released on 6 August 2009 through Harper. The novel was well received.

Plot
The story revolves around Orm Rurikson, a young man who joined the crew of a Viking band as a child and is now their reluctant leader. This novel centres around the oathsworn band returning to their quest for Attila the Hun’s legendary lost hoard of silver. A number of their band have been kidnapped by Prince Vladimir and face impalement should Orm fail to bring them the treasure.

Reception
The novel was well received by critics.

In an article for the Yorkshire Evening Post, the reviewer states that the novel is "another rip-roaring yarn from Low, told with enormous panache" and that "Low has shown himself to be most adept at constructing an authentic historical atmosphere". Reviewing for Black Gate magazine Bill Ward writes, of the hardships suffered by the oathsworn in their journey across the Mongolian steppe, "like the rest of Low’s work it is all as real and authentic as a journal entry from someone who actually suffered through such things." and stated he found the language "beautifully evocative".

References

External links
 

2009 British novels
Novels set in the Dark Ages
Novels set in the Viking Age
Scottish historical novels
Novels by Robert Low
Cultural depictions of Vladimir the Great
HarperCollins books